Out in the Streets is a song written by Ellie Greenwich and Jeff Barry.
It was first recorded by the American girl group the Shangri-Las in 1965 and released as their fifth single. The song was produced by Shadow Morton, arranged by Artie Butler and  released on Red Bird Records (RB 10-025) with the Morton composition “The Boy” on the B-Side, It reached # 53 on the US Billboard Top 100.

It was performed on the TV show Shindig! in 1965.

The song was covered by Blondie in 1975; but this cover was not released until 1994, when it was included on The Platinum Collection. Blondie subsequently covered it again in 1999 for their album No Exit.

The song was used in artist Elizabeth Price's 2012 Turner Prize winning video installation The Woolworths Choir of 1979.

The song is sampled in Sharleen Spiteri's song All the Times I Cried.

References

1965 singles
1965 songs
Songs written by Jeff Barry
Songs written by Ellie Greenwich
The Shangri-Las songs
Blondie (band) songs
Red Bird Records singles
Song recordings with Wall of Sound arrangements